Dregea is a genus of vines in the Apocynaceae, established by Ernst Meyer in 1838. It is native to southern Africa, Yemen and eastern Asia from China to Sulawesi.

Description
As given in Flora of British India, Vol. 4 (1883):
"Twining shrubs, glabrous or hoary. Leaves opposite, ovate or cordate, acuminate. Cymes axillary, umbelliform; flowers green. Sepals small. Corolla rotate, lobes broad, overlapping to the right. Coronal scales 5, hemispheric, fleshy, adnate to the column, spreading, inner angle cuspidate, the tooth incumbent on the anthers. Column very short, fleshy; anther-tips short inflexed ; pollen-masses one in each cell, cylindric-ohlong, shortly pedicelled, waxy, erect. Stigma conical or dome-shaped. Follicles thick, hard, winged or ribbed. Seeds comose."

Species
, Plants of the World Online accepted the following species:
 Dregea arabica Decne., syn. Marsdenia robusta – Socotra, mainland Yemen
 Dregea cuneifolia Tsiang & P.T.Li - Guangxi Province in China
 Dregea floribunda E.Mey. - South Africa
 Dregea schumanniana (Warb.) Schneidt, Liede & Meve
 Dregea sinensis Hemsl. - China (Gansu, Guangxi, Guizhou, Hubei, Hunan, Jiangsu, Shaanxi, Shanxi, Sichuan, Tibet, Yunnan, Zhejiang)
 Dregea stellaris (Ridl.) Ridl.
 Dregea taynguyenensis T.B.Tran & Rodda
 Dregea yunnanensis (Tsiang) Tsiang & P.T.Li - China (Gansu, Sichuan, Tibet, Yunnan)

Former species include
 Dregea volubilis (L.f.) Benth. ex Hook.f. → Wattakaka volubilis

References

External links
photo of herbarium specimen at Missouri Botanical Garden, Dregea floribunda, collected in South Africa

Asclepiadoideae